The 2015 Europe's Strongest Man was a strongman competition that took place in Leeds, England on the 10th July 2015 at the Headingley Stadium. This event was part of the 2015 Giants live tour.

Results of events

Event 1: Max Deadlift
Weight: Starting weight  

^ Rauno Heinla sustained an injury in this event and took no further part in the competition.

Event 2: Medley
Weight: 1 x barrel, 1 x tyre and 1 x sack. Also  duck walk.
Course Length: 
Time Limit: 75 seconds

^ Eddie Hall sustained an injury in this event and took no further part in the competition.

Event 3: Car Walk
Weight:  
Course Length:

Event 4: Front Hold
Weight:

Event 5: Log Lift
Weight:  for as many repetitions as possible.
Time Limit: 60 seconds

Event 6: Atlas Stones

Final Results

References

External links 

Competitions in the United Kingdom
Europe's Strongest Man